Henry Horwitz (1938 – 2019) was an American historian specialising in late seventeenth century English politics.

Academic career

Horwitz was awarded a D.Phil. from the University of Oxford in 1963 and a J.D. from the University of Iowa College of Law in 1982. He started working for Iowa University in 1963 and retired in April 2004.

Works

Revolution Politicks. The Career of Daniel Finch Second Earl of Nottingham, 1647-1730 (Cambridge: Cambridge University Press, 1968).
Parliament, Policy and Politics in the Reign of William III (Manchester: Manchester University Press, 1977).

Notes

1938 births
2019 deaths
21st-century American historians
21st-century American male writers
Alumni of the University of Oxford
University of Iowa College of Law alumni
Historians of England
University of Iowa faculty
American male non-fiction writers